The Shwesandaw Pagoda is a Buddhist pagoda located in Bagan, Myanmar. It is the tallest pagoda in Bagan, and contains a series of five terraces, topped with a cylindrical stupa, which has a bejewelled umbrella (hti). The pagoda was built by King Anawrahta in 1057, and once contained terra cotta tiles depicting scenes from the Jataka. Enshrined within the pagoda are sacred hairs of Gautama Buddha, which were obtained from Thaton.

See also
 List of tallest structures built before the 20th century

References

Pagodas in Myanmar
11th-century Buddhist temples
Bagan
Buddhist pilgrimage sites in Myanmar